Osgoldcross was a parliamentary constituency in the Osgoldcross Rural District of West Yorkshire.  It returned one Member of Parliament (MP) to the House of Commons of the Parliament of the United Kingdom, elected by the first past the post system.

History 

The constituency was created when the two-member Eastern West Riding of Yorkshire was divided by the Redistribution of Seats Act 1885 for the 1885 general election.  It was abolished for the 1918 general election.

Boundaries 
The Redistribution of Seats Act 1885 provided that the constituency should consist of
 the municipal borough of Pontefract,
 the wapentake of Osgoldcross,
 the Parishes in the Sessional Division of Upper Barkston Ash of Brotherton, Fairburn, Ledsham and Ledstone, and
 the Parishes in the Sessional Division of Skyrack of Allerton Bywater and Kippax.

Members of Parliament

Elections

Elections in the 1880s

Elections in the 1890s 

Austin left the Liberal Party and sought re-election as an independent candidate.

Elections in the 1900s

Elections in the 1910s 

General Election 1914–15:

Another General Election was required to take place before the end of 1915. The political parties had been making preparations for an election to take place and by the July 1914, the following candidates had been selected; 
Liberal: Joseph Compton-Rickett
Unionist: 
Labour: John Potts

See also 
 Osgoldcross Rural District

References 

Parliamentary constituencies in Yorkshire and the Humber (historic)
Constituencies of the Parliament of the United Kingdom established in 1885
Constituencies of the Parliament of the United Kingdom disestablished in 1918
Pontefract